A mechanical pencil, also clutch pencil, is a pencil with a replaceable and mechanically extendable solid pigment core called a "lead" . The lead, often made of graphite, is not bonded to the outer casing, and can be mechanically extended as its point is worn away as it is being used. 

Other names include: microtip pencil, automatic pencil, drafting pencil, technical pencil, click pencil (generally refers to a specific brand), pump pencil, leadholder, Pacer (Australian English, ca. the 1980s), propelling pencil (British and Australian English, often refers to higher-end mechanical pencils), pen pencil (Indian English), and lead pencil (Bangladeshi and American English).

Mechanical pencils are used to provide lines of constant width, without need of sharpening, for tasks such as technical drawing as well as for clean looking writing. They are also used for fine-art drawing. Since they do not have to be sharpened, they are also popular with students. Mechanical pencils were first used in the 18th century, with many designs patented in the 19th and 20th centuries.

History

Conrad Gesner described a lead holder pencil in 1565, but the lead had to be manually adjusted to sharpen it. The earliest extant example of a mechanical pencil was found aboard the wreckage of HMS Pandora, which sank in 1791.

The first patent for a refillable pencil with lead-propelling mechanism was issued to Sampson Mordan and John Isaac Hawkins in Britain in 1822. After buying out Hawkins' patent rights, Mordan entered into a business partnership with Gabriel Riddle from 1823 to 1837. The earliest Mordan pencils are thus hallmarked SMGR. After 1837, Mordan ended his partnership with Riddle and continued to manufacture pencils as "S. Mordan & Co". His company continued to manufacture pencils and a wide range of silver objects until World War II, when the factory was bombed.

Between 1822 and 1874, more than 160 patents were registered pertaining to a variety of improvements to mechanical pencils. The first spring-loaded mechanical pencil was patented in 1877 and a twist-feed mechanism was developed in 1895. The 0.9  mm lead was introduced in 1938, and later it was followed by 0.3, 0.5 and 0.7 sizes. Eventually, 1.3 and 1.4  mm mechanisms were available, and 0.4 and 0.2 versions are now produced.

The mechanical pencil became successful in Japan with some improvements in 1915 by Tokuji Hayakawa, a metalworker who had just finished his apprenticeship. It was introduced as the "Ever-Ready Sharp Pencil". Success was not immediate since the metal shaft—essential for the pencil's long life—was unfamiliar to users. The Ever-Ready Sharp began selling in huge numbers after a company from Tokyo and Osaka made large orders. Later, Tokuji Hayakawa's company got its name from that pencil: Sharp.

At nearly the same time in the US, Charles R. Keeran was developing a similar pencil that would be the precursor of most of today's pencils. Keeran's design was ratchet-based, whereas Hayakawa's was screw-based. These two development histories – Hayakawa and Keeran – are often mistakenly combined into one. Keeran patented his lead pencil in 1915 and soon afterwards arranged production. After some improvements, his design was marketed as the "Eversharp" pencil by the Wahl Adding Machine Company; by the early 1920s, Wahl had sold more than 12,000,000 Eversharps.

Some of the manufacturers are: Pentel, Pilot, Tombow, Uni-ball and Zebra of Japan; Faber-Castell, Lamy, Rotring and Staedtler of Germany; Koh-i-Noor Hardtmuth of the Czech Republic; Bic of France; Monami of South Korea; PaperMate and Parker of USA; Caran d'Ache of Switzerland and numerous Chinese as well as other Asian and European manufacturers.

Mechanism types

Mechanical pencils can be divided into two basic types: those that both hold the lead and can actively propel it forward, and those that only hold the lead in position.

Screw-based pencils advance the lead by twisting a screw, which moves a slider down the barrel of the pencil. This was the most common type in the earlier part of the twentieth century. Many of these have a locking mechanism one way to allow the lead to be pushed back into the pencil.

A clutch pencil (or leadholder) tends to use thicker leads (2.0–5.6 mm) and generally holds only one piece of lead at a time. A typical clutch pencil is activated by pressing the eraser cap on the top, to open the jaws inside the tip and allow the lead to freely drop through from the barrel (or back into it when retracting). Because the lead falls out freely when the jaws are opened, its forward movement cannot be controlled except by external means. This can be easily done by keeping the tip of the pencil a few millimeters above a work surface or the palm of one's hand. Some clutch pencils do have mechanisms which incrementally advance the lead, such as the Alvin Tech-Matic leadholder, but these are not normally considered to be in the same category as most pencils with propelling mechanisms.

Ratchet-based pencils are a variant of the clutch pencil, in which the lead is held in place by two or three small jaws inside a ring at the tip. The jaws are controlled by a button on the end or the side of the pencil. When the button is pushed, the jaws move forward and separate, allowing the lead to advance. When the button is released and the jaws retract, the "lead retainer" (a small rubber device inside the tip) keeps the lead in place, preventing the lead from either falling freely outward or riding back up into the barrel until the jaws recover their grip. Other designs use a precisely-fitted metal sleeve to guide and support the lead, and do not need a rubber retainer.

In one type of ratchet-based pencil, shaking the pencil back and forth causes a weight inside the pencil to operate a mechanism in the cap. A button may be present on the top or side of the pencil, to allow the user to advance the lead manually when necessary. Another variation advances the lead automatically. In this design, the lead is advanced by a ratchet but only prevented from going back into the pencil, just held from falling by a small amount of friction. The nib is a spring-loaded collar that, when depressed as the lead is worn away, extends out again when pressure is released.

An advanced ratchet type has a mechanism that rotates the pencil lead 9° counter-clockwise every time the lead is pressed on to the paper (which counts as one stroke), to distribute wear evenly. This auto-rotation mechanism keeps the lead 50% narrower than in the common propelling mechanical pencils, resulting in uniform thickness of the lines written onto the paper. The design was first patented by Schmidt of Germany, and later developed by Mitsubishi Pencil Company of Japan, and named Kuru Toga under the Uni brand. This type of pencil is most suited for Asian languages that have multiple strokes per letter or word, where the pencil is frequently lifted off the paper. The mechanism is less suitable for cursive writing used in western scripts. Another recent auto-rotation movement by Uni rotates the lead 18 degrees per stroke (or 20 strokes per complete revolution), which is better suited for western scripts.

There exist protection mechanisms that prevent the lead from breaking (within certain limits) when excessive pressure is exerted while writing. A mechanism employed in the DelGuard system by Zebra of Japan causes the lead sleeve to extend outward when excessive pressure is applied at an angle. When excess vertical pressure is applied on the lead, the lead is automatically retracted inwards.

Higher-end mechanical pencils often feature a lead hardness grade indicator and sometimes feature a retractable lead guide pipe. This allows the lead guide pipe to retract back into the pencil body, which will keep it protected in storage and during transit and makes it 'pocket-safe'.

Lead variations

In spite of the name, pencil leads do not contain the toxic chemical element lead, but are typically made with graphite and clay, or plastic polymers. Compared to standard pencils, mechanical pencils have a smaller range of marking types, though numerous variations exist. Most mechanical pencils can be refilled, but some inexpensive models are meant to be disposable and are discarded when empty.

Diameter

Mechanical pencil mechanisms use only a single lead diameter. Some pencils, such as the Pentel Function 357, place several mechanisms within the same housing, so as to offer a range of thicknesses (in this case three: 0.3, 0.5 and 0.7 mm). 1.00 mm leads also exist, but they are very rare. (See table below.).

Different sizes of lead diameters are available to accommodate various preferences and pencil builds, as shown in the table below. The more common lead sizes are 0.5 mm and 0.7 mm, whose line widths provide a favourable balance between precision and strength. Less common lead sizes can range from 0.2 mm up to 5.6 mm. Pentel has also previously demonstrated a prototype 0.1 mm pencil.
Pencils with sub-millimeter leads can usually hold multiple leads at the same time, reducing the frequency of refills. One exception was the Pentel 350 E, possibly Pentel's first mechanical pencil, which could only hold a single stick of 0.5 mm lead. Refill leads can be bought in small tubes and inserted into the barrel as needed.

The bracketed values in inches were found by calculation and rounded to 3 decimal places.

Hardness
As with non-mechanical pencils, the leads of mechanical pencils are available in a range of hardness ratings, depending on the user's desired balance between darkness and durability. A commonly-used mechanical pencil lead is identical in density, but not in thickness to a traditional HB (US#2) pencil lead.

Pigments
Mechanical pencils with colored leads are less common, but do exist. Crayola's "Twistable" product line includes two different types of colored pencils (erasable and non-erasable) with mechanical feed mechanisms, but does not offer refill leads. Several companies such as Pentel, Pilot, and Uni-ball (Mitsubishi Pencil Co.) currently manufacture colored refill leads in a limited range of diameters (0.5 mm, 0.7 mm, or 2.0 mm) for their own products. Koh-i-Noor makes mechanical colored pencils with replaceable leads in 2.0, 3.15 and 5.6 mm sizes.

See also

Technical drawing tools

Notes and references

Bibliography
 Deborah Crosby, Victorian Pencils: Tools to Jewels, Schiffer Publishing Ltd., Atglen, PA, 1998
 Jonathan A. Veley, "The Catalogue of American Mechanical Pencils", Greyden Press, 2011

External links
 Sharp's history of the mechanical pencil
 History and development of Keeran's and Hayakawa's pencil styles
 Leadholder Museum (History and Images of Leadholders)
 Sampson Mordan. First patent for a mechanical pencil
Inventor never got rewards of pencil business - Pantagraph (Bloomington, Illinois newspaper)

Pencils
Writing implements